Czerwony Dwór  is a settlement in the administrative district of Gmina Zbąszyń, within Nowy Tomyśl County, Greater Poland Voivodeship, in west-central Poland.

References

Villages in Nowy Tomyśl County